Lince is a district of the Lima Province in Peru. It is part of the city of Lima.
Officially established as a district on May 29, 1936, the current mayor (alcalde) of Lince is Vicente Amable Escalante. The district's postal code is 14. Until 1936, when it was made into a separate district, Lince was attached to Miraflores and San Isidro district.

Geography
The district has a total land area of 3.03 km². Its administrative center is located 117 meters above sea level. The three main sections of Lince are the West Side (also known as Lobatón), the East Side (both sides are separated by Avenida Arenales), and San Eugenio, southeast of the East Side facing the Luis Bedoya Avenue and Expressway.

North to South, Lince follows the block numbering started in Santa Beatriz section of Lima District and its parallel in Jesús María, however, there are a few north-south avenues that do not have a Santa Beatriz counterpart, the district have a common area that is the Edgardo Rebagliati Martins Hospital with Jesús María, particularly on the East Side.

Although not commonly known, Lince possesses a great concentration of Art Deco architecture, comparable in density and style to the highly appreciated Art Deco architecture of the South Beach district of Miami Beach, Florida, USA.  Many of these art deco buildings in Lince (which include homes, businesses, schools, etc.), are well maintained and have endured little modification from their original design in the late 1930s.  The area, however, is not yet regarded as a tourism district nor as a historic preservation area.

Boundaries
 North: Jesús María and Lima
 East: La Victoria
 South: San Isidro
 West: San Isidro and Jesús María

Demographics
According to a 2002 estimate by the INEI, the district has 70,968 inhabitants and a population density of 23,421.8 persons/km². In 1999, there were 16,907 households in the district.

References

External links
  Official district's web site

Districts of Lima